Prkačin is a surname. Notable people with the surname include:

Ante Prkačin (born 1953), Croatian and Bosnian general and politician
Kristina Prkačin (born 1997), Croatian handball player
Nikola Prkačin (born 1975), Croatian basketball player
Roko Prkačin (born 2002), Croatian basketball player

Croatian surnames